The Sky Golem is a Czech two-place paraglider, designed and produced by Sky Paragliders of Frýdlant nad Ostravicí. It is named for the legendary Golem character and is now out of production.

Design and development
The Golem was designed as a tandem glider for flight training.

The glider is AFNOR Bi-Place certified.

Specifications (Golem)

References

Golem
Paragliders